Puntigam is the 17th and newest city district of Graz, in the Austrian province of Styria. A big part of the industry of Graz is situated here. 
As of 2010, there are about 6,900 people living in an area of 6.18 km².

History
The name Puntigam is originally a family name. It origins from the family who since the early modern era owned a mansion with an inn and a brewery in this area. The brewery Puntigam developed out of this in the 19th century. Together with the village Straßgang, Puntigam became the 16th city district of Graz, Straßgang, in 1938. In 1988, the district Puntigam was broken up from the 16th district Straßgang with small parts of the 5th district Gries and became the new 17th district.

Since the beginnings of the trams in Graz the line number 5 leads to Puntigam. Until 2006, the line number 5 reversed at the brewery Puntigam coming from Andritz. At the newly created local traffic connection Puntigam one can change to the bus lines 62, 64, 78 and 80. It is also planned to become a station of the new Koralmbahn Railway in about 2020.

Coming from Puntigam one can get via the Weblinger Gürtel street towards the rotary Webling which is located at the Pyhrn Autobahn (A9) motorway. From there one can quickly reach the motorway rotary Graz West at the crossing of the motorways A2 and A9.

Economy

For generations, the Puch factories are the dominant part of the economy in Puntigam and Liebenau. The brewery Puntigam is one of the most successful breweries in Austria. Even today a big part of the industry of Graz is situated in Puntigam. There are for example the firms Gowi Spielwaren (toys), Ankünder Außenwerbung (advertising), Spar Austria (retail) as well as recycling companies and others.

Sights
 Brewery Puntigam
 Church St. Leopold
 Puch factories

Schools
 Kindergarten Puntigam
 Elementary school Puntigam
 Cooperative Mittelschule Puntigam
 Polytechnical school Graz
 Chemistry engineer's school Graz

Literature
 Bernadette Pfingstl, Josef Pfingstl und Sabine Holasek: 125 Jahre Betriebsfeuerwehr Puntigam. Graz 1999. (Festschrift)

References

External links